The Martin 156, referred to in the press variously as the "Russian Clipper", "Moscow Clipper", or "Soviet Clipper" was a very large flying boat aircraft intended for trans-Pacific service. The single example of the M-156 was designed and built in response to a request from Pan American World Airways to provide a longer-range replacement for the Martin M-130.

Design and development

Martin delivered three Martin Ocean Transport Model-130s (M-130) to Pan Am in 1935 which were flown as the China Clipper, Philippine Clipper and Hawaii Clipper. Pan Am rejected the M-156 in preference to the Boeing 314 for its replacement. 

Pan Am was seeking to expand its trans-Pacific air service between San Francisco and Hong Kong in 1937. This route had been pioneered by the Martin M-130 and Pan Am was in need of a larger aircraft. Pan Am would have configured the M-156 as a 26-berth sleeper. The trans-Pacific flights flying Hawaii -Midway Islands - Wake Island - Guam - Manila - Hong Kong were less than half the California to Hawaii leg. With a lower fuel load requirement, the M-156 could carry additional passengers. The M-156 would have been converted to a 33- to 56-seat day trip configuration. Pan Am and Matson Liners advertised an "Air-Sea Cruise" where Matson Liners carried passengers from San Francisco to Honolulu. Passengers would then transfer to Pan Am Clippers for westward flights to China and the Orient.

After Pan Am selected the Boeing 314, Martin negotiated a deal with the Soviet Union for this aircraft and the M-156 was never put into regular trans-Pacific service. The M-156 was sold to the Soviets and operated by Aeroflot on the Soviet Union's far-east routes under the designation PS-30.

Like the M-130, the M-156 was a four-engined, parasol wing design. The M-156 also differed from the M-130 by having a horizontal stabilizer mounted atop a pylon at the rear of the hull, with twin vertical stabilizers and twin rudders located atop the horizontal stabilizer.

Along with the increase in wing size, fuel capacity was expanded from the M-130's 3,165 gal (11,981 L) to a total of 4,260 gal (16,126 L) in the M-156/PS-30.

The Soviet government purchased the M-156 from Martin in 1937. The sale included a set of production plans, engineering specifications and manufacturing licenses as the Soviets intended to mass-produce this aircraft. The German invasion of the Soviet Union in 1941 negated these plans.

The single M-156/PS-30 was put into regular service in 1940 by Aeroflot and was utilized in the Soviet Far East along the Pacific coast. In this role, Aeroflot configured the aircraft to carry up to 70 passengers. It was flown by Aeroflot until 1944, at which time it was scrapped.

Specifications (Martin 156C)

See also
Boeing 314 Clipper
Dornier Do X
Kawanishi H6K
Latécoère 521
Latécoère 631
Short Empire
Short S.26
Sikorsky S-40
Sikorsky S-42

References

External links

1930s United States airliners
Flying boats
156
Four-engined tractor aircraft
High-wing aircraft
Four-engined piston aircraft